Ytterbium(III) iodide is one of ytterbium's iodides, with the chemical formula of YbI3.

Preparation 

Ytterbium(III) iodide can be prepared by reacting metallic ytterbium with iodine at 500°C with a 30 atm pressure:

 2 Yb + 3 I2 → 2 YbI3

Ytterbium(III) oxide, ytterbium(III) hydroxide or ytterbium(III) carbonate can react with hydroiodic acid to obtain ytterbium(III) iodide in aqueous solution:

 Yb2O3 + 6 HI → 2 YbI3 + 3 H2O
 Yb(OH)3 + 3 HI → YbI3 + 3 H2O
 Yb2(CO3)3 + 6 HI → 2 YbI3 + 3 H2O + 3 CO2

The ytterbium(III) iodide hydrate crystallized from the solution can be heated with ammonium iodide to obtain the anhydrous form.

Reactions 

Ytterbium(III) iodide decomposes to ytterbium(II) iodide upon heating:
2 YbI3 → 2 YbI2 + I2

References 

Ytterbium compounds
Iodides
Lanthanide halides